This is a list of historical states and dynasties that were notable for their predominant observance of Zoroastrianism, an Iranian religion founded by the spiritual leader Zoroaster. 

Median Empire (678 BCE – 549 BCE) 
 Achaemenid Empire (550 BCE – 330 BCE) 

 Kingdom of Atropatene (323 BCE – 226 CE)
Kingdom of Armenia (321 BCE – 330 CE) 
Kingdom of Sophene (260 BCE – 95 BCE) 
 Parthian Empire (247 BCE – 224 CE)
Frataraka dynasty (164 BCE – 132 BCE) 

 Kingdom of Persis (132 BCE – 224 CE)
Kingdom of Albania (1st century BCE – 314 CE) 
Indo-Parthian Kingdom (19 CE –226 CE) 
 Sassanid Empire (224 CE – 651) 
 Kushano-Sasanian Kingdom (230 – 365)
Afridhid dynasty (305 – 995) 
 Dabuyid dynasty (642 – 760)
 Masmughans of Damavand (651 – 760)
 Bavand dynasty (651 – 842)
 Padusbanids (665 – 9th century)
 Qarinvand dynasty (550s – 11th century)

See also
 Zoroastrianism
 List of Iranian dynasties and countries

References

External links
BBC - Religions - Zoroastrian: Under Persian rule

 Zoroastrianism
Zoroastrian rulers
 History of Zoroastrianism
Zoroastrian